Branisko (or Branyiszko) is a mountain range in eastern Slovakia, between the Spiš and Šariš regions. It is a 20 km long and 5 km wide mountain range in the north–south direction, belonging to the Fatra-Tatra Area of the Inner Western Carpathians.

The mountain range is divided into two massifs: the larger Smrekovica with the highest hill Smrekovica (1200 m) and the lower one, the Sľubica, with the highest elevation point Sľubica (1129,4 m).

References

Mountain ranges of Slovakia
Mountain ranges of the Western Carpathians